This is a list of holidays in Cameroon

Fixed

Movable holidays
The following holidays are public holidays but the date on which each occurs varies, according to its corresponding calendar, and thus has no set date.

See also
Nigeria

References

Cameroonian culture
Cameroon
Cameroon